Year 1397 (MCCCXCVII) was a common year starting on Monday (link will display the full calendar) of the Julian calendar.

Events 
 January–December 
 January – Mircea I takes back the throne of Wallachia.
 February 10 – John Beaufort becomes Earl of Somerset in England.
 June 6 – Richard Whittington is nominated as Lord Mayor of London for the first time.
 July 12 – Richard II of England attempts to reassert authority over his kingdom by arresting members of a group of powerful barons known as the Lords Appellant.
 July 17 – Eric of Pomerania is crowned in Kalmar (Sweden) as ruler of the Kalmar Union, a personal union of the three kingdoms of Denmark, Norway (with Iceland, Greenland, the Faroe Islands, Shetland and Orkney) and Sweden (including Finland and Åland) engineered by Queen Margaret I of Denmark, his great-aunt and adoptive mother, who retains de facto power in the realm.
 September 25 – The Treaty of Kalmar is signed.
 September 29 
 John Holland, Earl of Huntingdon is created Duke of Exeter, by his half-brother King Richard II of England.
 Thomas Holland, 3rd Earl of Kent, John's brother, is created Duke of Surrey by King Richard.
 November 8 – Thomas Arundel, accused of high treason by King Richard II of England, is replaced by Roger Walden as Archbishop of Canterbury.

 Date unknown 
 The Ottomans capture the town of Vidin, the capital of the Tsardom of Vidin, the only remaining independent Bulgarian state. Emperor Ivan Sratsimir of Vidin is taken prisoner by early this year and later disappears while his son Constantine II becomes Emperor in his place.
 Temür Qutlugh is crowned as the Khan of Golden Horde with the help of general Edigu, although Edigu continues to hold the real power.
 The Università, a form of local government, is established in Malta.
 The Kirillo-Belozersky Monastery is founded in northwestern Russia.
 The Sretensky Monastery is founded in Moscow.
 The first hospital in al-Andalus is created, at Granada. 
 Neuhausergasse 4, the brewer of Spaten, is listed on the register of Munich breweries.
 Gregory of Tatev writes the Book of Questions, a ten-volume encyclopedic work, at the Tatev Monastery, in Armenia.

Births 
 February 21 – Infanta Isabel, Duchess of Burgundy (d. 1471)
 May 15 – Sejong the Great of Joseon, ruler of Korea (d. 1450)
 August 10 – Albert II of Germany, Holy Roman Emperor (d. 1439)
 November 15 – Pope Nicholas V (d. 1455)
 date unknown
 Chimalpopoca, Aztec ruler of Tenochtitlán (d. 1427)
 Tlacaelel, Aztec nobleman (d. 1487)
 Paolo dal Pozzo Toscanelli, Italian mathematician (d. 1482)
 John de Ros, 7th Baron Ros, English noble and soldier (d. 1421)
 Paolo Uccello, Florentine painter (d. 1475)

Deaths 
 January 11 – Skirgaila, Grand Duke of Lithuania
 February 18 – Enguerrand VII, Lord of Coucy (b. 1340)
 March 14 – Henry VIII the Sparrow, Duke of Żagań–Głogów (b. c. 1357)
 April 25 – Thomas Holland, 2nd Earl of Kent (b. 1350)
 June 3 – William Montacute, 2nd Earl of Salisbury, English military leader (b. 1328)
 June 16 – Philip of Artois, Count of Eu, French soldier (b. 1358)
 July 15 – Catherine of Henneberg, German ruler (b. c. 1334)
 September 2 – Francesco Landini, Italian composer
 September 8 – Thomas of Woodstock, 1st Duke of Gloucester, son of King Edward III of England (b. 1355)
 September 15 – Adam Easton, English cardinal
 September 21 – Richard FitzAlan, 11th Earl of Arundel, English military leader (executed) (b. 1346)
 October 6 – Vuk Branković, Serbian lord (b. 1345)

References